Cedar Springs Public Schools is a school district in the U.S. state of Michigan.

Secondary schools
Cedar Springs High School (9th - 12th grade)
Cedar Springs Middle School (7th - 8th grade)
New Beginnings Alternative High School (9th - 12th grade)

Elementary schools 
Beach Elementary (2nd - 3rd grade)
Cedar Trails Elementary (Preschool - 1st grade)
Cedar View Elementary (4th - 5th grade)
Red Hawk Elementary (6th grade)

References

External links

Cedar Springs
Education in Kent County, Michigan